Time for a Change is the third studio album released by R&B singer Cupid. The album's lead single was "Cupid Shuffle". It peaked at #9 on the R&B charts and #58 on the Billboard Top 200.

Track listing

"Work" (Produced by K. Shelton aka Severe Garcia & S. Turner aka Black Vegah for Family Biz Ent.) - 3:21
"Closer" - 3:30
"Do Yo Dance" (Prod. By P-NO The Matrikks)(featuring Cristal) - 3:30
"The Let Out" (featuring T-Pain & Tay Dizm) - 3:33
"Cupid Shuffle" - 3:51
"3-6-9" (featuring B.o.B) - 3:32
"Spin The Bottle" (featuring Shorty Da Kid) - 4:05
"Someone Like You" - 3:33
"Say Yes" - 3:30
"Don't Love Her to Death" - 4:58
"Cupid Shot You" Written by Andre Merritt (produced by Stereotypes)  - 3:45
"I Love Me" (featuring Foxx) - 4:18

References

2007 albums
Cupid (singer) albums
Atlantic Records albums